Jolgeh Sankhvast District is a district (bakhsh) in Jajrom County, North Khorasan Province, Iran. At the 2006 census, its population was 7,796, in 2,074 families.  The District has one city: Sankhvast.  The District has two rural districts (dehestan): Chahardeh Sankhvast Rural District and Darband Rural District.

References 

Districts of North Khorasan Province
Jajrom County